Stephen Alan Spooner (born 25 January 1961) is an English footballer who played as a central midfielder.

Spooner began his professional career with Derby County but got his breakthrough with Halifax Town, where in the 1982–83 season he was a key player in midfield in Halifax's highest league finish of the decade (11th). He then moved to Chesterfield where he won promotion in 1985, and then on to Hereford United, York City, Rotherham United, Mansfield Town and Blackpool before finishing his League career at Chesterfield. He then later went into non-league football and has since worked as a coach in numerous roles. Currently Spooner is the lead Professional Development Coach with Birmingham City and was appointed in temporary charge of the first-team alongside Craig Gardner on 9 July 2020 following the departure of Pep Clotet.

Spooner is a Christian.

Honours
Individual
PFA Team of the Year: 1989–90 Fourth Division

References

External links
 
 Profile

1961 births
Living people
Footballers from Sutton, London
English footballers
Association football midfielders
Derby County F.C. players
Halifax Town A.F.C. players
Chesterfield F.C. players
Hereford United F.C. players
York City F.C. players
Rotherham United F.C. players
Mansfield Town F.C. players
Blackpool F.C. players
Rushden & Diamonds F.C. players
Burton Albion F.C. players
English Football League players
National League (English football) players
Birmingham City F.C. non-playing staff
English Christians